Saath Saath  (together) is a 1982 Indian Hindi-language drama film written and directed by Raman Kumar and produced by Dilip Dhawan. It stars Farooque Shaikh and Deepti Naval in the lead roles, and was first released in India on 4 March 1982.

Plot
Avinash Verma, an M.A. student, is an idealistic young man with socialist beliefs and strict principles. He is unaffected by his generation's materialism and is adamantly opposed to accumulating more wealth than is required. Although he is the son of a wealthy landowner, he has moved out of his father's home owing to philosophical disagreements. He earns a living as a freelance writer. His classmate Geetanjali Gupta, also known as Geeta, who is the daughter of a textile mill owner, develops a crush on him because of his worldview. Geeta also leaves her father's house, and they marry and are soon expecting a kid. Taking care of this family presents challenges for Avinash. He must work at the publishing company Satish Shah, a classmate, owns due to his precarious financial situation. He soon begins to adopt the traits of a ruthless businessman and travels the route he previously detested. Geeta is astonished by his change in principles and decides to leave him. Avinash admits his mistake, quits his job, and joins the publishing company of his former professor Choudhary.

Cast

 Farooq Shaikh as Avinash Verma
 Deepti Naval as Gitanjali Gupta "Geeta"
 Satish Shah as Satish Shah
 Rakesh Bedi as Rakesh
 Neena Gupta as Neena
 Avtar Gill as Avtar
 A. K. Hangal as Professor Chaudhary
 Iftekhar as Mr. Gupta
 Javed Khan as Javed
 Yunus Parvez as Jagat Murari
 Gita Siddharth as Mrs Gupta (Voice)
 Anjan Srivastav as Dr. B. M. Acharya
 Helena as Helena
 Kiran Vairale as Kiran
 Sudha Chopra as Professor

Soundtrack

References

External links 
 

1982 films
1980s Hindi-language films